Maximilian II may refer to:

Maximilian II of Burgundy (1514–1558)
Maximilian II, Holy Roman Emperor (1527–1576)
Maximilian II Emanuel, Elector of Bavaria (1662–1726)
Maximilian II of Bavaria (1811–1864)
Maximilian von Götzen-Iturbide (b. 1944), titular Emperor of Mexico (1949–)

See also
Maximilian Egon II, Prince of Fürstenberg (1863–1941)